The 2021 KBS Entertainment Awards ( presented by Korean Broadcasting System (KBS), took place on December 25, 2021, at KBS New Wing Open Hall in Yeouido-dong, Yeongdeungpo-gu, Seoul. It was hosted by Kim Sung-joo, Moon Se-yoon and Han Sun-hwa. Daesang (Grand Prize) was awarded to Moon Se-yoon for 2 Days & 1 Night 4, .

Nominations and winners

Presenters

See also 
 2021 MBC Entertainment Awards
 2021 SBS Entertainment Awards

References

External links 
  
 

Korean Broadcasting System original programming
KBS Entertainment Awards
2021 television awards
2021 in South Korea